Dame Margaret June Clark,  (born 31 May 1941) is Professor Emeritus of Community Nursing, at Swansea University in Wales.

Career
Before her retirement in 2003 Clark was responsible for the development of a program of research in community health nursing and primary health care at Swansea University. Her special interest is the development and use of standardized nomenclatures to describe nursing practice, in particular in primary health care.
In 1990, she left the NHS and went into higher education as Professor of Nursing to start a new School of Nursing at Middlesex University. In 1997 she "went home to Wales" as the first professor of nursing at Swansea University.

During the 1990s she was consultant to the International Council of Nurses' project to develop an International Classification of Nursing Practice (ICNP). She is deputy president of the Welsh Nursing Academy. Clark qualified as a nurse at University College Hospital, London, after obtaining an honours degree in Classics at the University of London.

She worked as a health visitor, and remained in community nursing as a manager, professor, and political advocate for nearly 40 years. She obtained her MPhil degree at the University of Reading in 1972, and her PhD from South Bank Polytechnic in 1985.

She has also been heavily involved in nursing at an international level. Following the break-up of the Soviet Union she worked to help develop nursing leadership in Kazakhstan and Romania. She is a visiting professor at the University of Primorska, Slovenia. She is a frequent speaker at international conferences, has participated in numerous international task groups and workshops, has acted as consultant to WHO and ICN, and has represented the UK on ICN and European Union committees.
 In 2001 she was the keynote speaker of the 'Anna Reynvaan Lecture' in Amsterdam (The Netherlands).

She is an active member of Sigma Theta Tau International, and was instrumental in establishing the Upsilon-Xi Chapter in Wales - the first in the UK and only the third in Europe and was STTI Board member from 2009 to 2011.

She has been an RCN activist since her student days and has held many leadership roles in the RCN, including serving as president from 1990 to 1994.

Legacy
 The June Clark Travel Scholarship Trust

Honours
In 1995 she was named Dame Commander of the Order of the British Empire (DBE) for her services to nursing.

She was made a Fellow of the Royal College of Nursing in 1982.

She was awarded the RCN Award of Merit in 1996.

References

1941 births
Living people
Alumni of the University of London
Alumni of the UCL Medical School
Alumni of the University of Reading
Alumni of London South Bank University
Academics of Swansea University
Dames Commander of the Order of the British Empire
Fellows of the Royal College of Nursing
People from Sheffield
Presidents of the Royal College of Nursing
British nurses